Camelia Diaconescu (born 2 February 1963) is a Romanian rower. Competing in the eights she won an Olympic silver medal in 1984 and world championships bronze medals in 1985 and 1986.

References

External links
 
 
 
 

1963 births
Living people
Romanian female rowers
Rowers at the 1984 Summer Olympics
Olympic silver medalists for Romania
Olympic rowers of Romania
World Rowing Championships medalists for Romania
Medalists at the 1984 Summer Olympics